The 1972 Middle Tennessee Blue Raiders football team represented Middle Tennessee State University—as a member of the Ohio Valley Conference (OVC) during the 1972 NCAA College Division football season. Led by third-year head coach Bill Peck, the Blue Raiders compiled a record an overall record of 7–3–1 with a mark of 4–2–1 in conference play, placing third in the OVC. The team's captains were C. Holt and Greg Gregory.

Schedule

References

Middle Tennessee
Middle Tennessee Blue Raiders football seasons
Middle Tennessee Blue Raiders football